Laura Vandiver Hall (born January 25, 1943) is an American politician who currently serves in the Alabama House of Representatives representing House District 19 as a Democrat. Hall was first elected to the Alabama House of Representatives by special election in August 1993. She was re-elected in 1994 until now. She is a retired educator whose tenure in the education field extended for over forty years.

Early life and education
Hall is a native of Pendleton, South Carolina.  She received her elementary and secondary education in Pendleton Public Schools System. After graduating from Anderson County Training High School in 1960, she enrolled in Morris College in Sumter, South Carolina, and earned a Bachelor of Science degree in biology with chemistry as a minor.  Further studies earned her a Master of Science degree in science education from Ohio State University and a K-12 administration certification from Alabama Agricultural and Mechanical University.

Legislative career

Hall is the first African American woman elected to represent House District 19, capturing eighty-six (86) percent of the vote. Results from the 1994 election indicated that she captured 88% percent of the votes. During the 1998 election, she ran unopposed. She won the 2002 election and began serving a fifth term. Hall is the vice-chair of the Madison County Legislative Delegation and Ranking Minority Member of both the General Fund Finance and Appropriations and Internal Affairs committees.

Her sponsored legislation includes:
HB 427 which created a system of “Silver Alerts” for which all missing persons with dementia or Alzheimer's disease are eligible, regardless of age, as well as requiring law enforcement personnel to undergo specialized training regarding such cases.
HB 474 which designated December 1 as Rosa Parks Day in honor of the “First Lady of Civil Rights.”
HB 115 which created a policy by which newborns can be brought to hospitals within 72 hours of birth instead of being abandoned.

Committees
Her committee assignments have included:  
 Judiciary
 Joint Interim on Medicaid
 Public Safety
 Welfare
 Health
 Industrial and Economic Development
 Joint Budget and Finance
 Government Finance and Appropriations
 Alabama Monument Protection

Personal life
Hall was married to the late Dr. John W. Hall. She has two children.

2009 special election
Republican Paul Sanford defeated Hall in the special election to fill the District 7 State Senate Seat vacated earlier this year when the incumbent Parker Griffith was elected to the United States House of Representative representing Alabama's 5th Congressional District. Hall continues to represent District 19 after re-elections in 2010 and 2014.

2018 general election
Hall defeated Samuel Greene in the Alabama House of Representatives District 19 Democratic primary election with 86.04% of the vote.

References

External links

 

1943 births
Living people
Morris College (South Carolina) alumni
Alabama A&M University alumni
Women state legislators in Alabama
Democratic Party members of the Alabama House of Representatives
Ohio State University College of Education and Human Ecology alumni
People from Anderson County, South Carolina
Politicians from Huntsville, Alabama
People from Pendleton, South Carolina
Delta Sigma Theta members
21st-century American politicians
21st-century American women politicians
African-American state legislators in Alabama
21st-century African-American women
21st-century African-American politicians
20th-century African-American people
20th-century African-American women